The Stonewall Formation is a stratigraphical unit of Late Ordovician to Early Silurian age in the Western Canadian Sedimentary Basin. 

It takes the name from Stonewall, Manitoba, and was first described in the Stonewall quarry by E.M. Kindle in 1914.

Lithology
The Stonewall Formation is composed of finely crystalline dolomite, with a basal argillaceous and sandy dolomite (the Williams Member). Two thin sandstone beds occur in the middle and at the top of the formation.

In the central Williston basin, the base is marked by an anhydrite bed.

Distribution
The Stonewall Formation occurs at surface in the Manitoba outcrop belt and in the sub-surface in the Williston Basin.

Relationship to other units

The Stonewall Formation is overlain by the Interlake Group (conformably in the south, disconformably in the north) and sharply overlays the Stony Mountain Formation.

References

Ordovician Alberta
Ordovician Manitoba
Ordovician Saskatchewan
Silurian Alberta
Silurian Manitoba
Silurian Saskatchewan
Western Canadian Sedimentary Basin
Stratigraphy of Manitoba
Stratigraphy of Saskatchewan
Stonewall, Manitoba
Ordovician southern paleotropical deposits